The Social Democratic Party (PSD) was a political party in Brazil between 1945 and 1965. It was founded by Getúlio Vargas when he transformed his Estado Novo into a multi-party system. The PSD was a centrist party which represented the more conservative wing of the Getulist movement.  The other pro-Vargas party was the  Brazilian Labour Party (PTB).

The PSD was the most important Brazilian political party during the 1945–1964 democratic period, electing Presidents Eurico Gaspar Dutra in 1945 and Juscelino Kubitschek in 1955. After the coup d'état in 1964, when military dictatorship kicked in, it was banned together with all other parties.

The party relied on powerful networks of rural elites in the less-developed parts of the country. It was dominated by executives appointed by the Getúlio Vargas regime and was therefore strongly interwoven with the state apparatus. It was ideologically moderate, considered centrist by some scholars and conservative by others.

The PSD's representation in the Brazilian Chamber of Deputies steadily shrunk from 52.8% of the seats in 1945 to 28.9% in 1962. By 1963, the Labour Party, PSD's minor opposition party, had more seats than the PSD. A considerable faction within the PSD turned against President João Goulart, a PTB member who had been Vice President until he stood in for retired President Jânio Quadros in 1961, whom they deemed to be too leftist. They therefore supported the military coup d'état on 1 April 1964, making an important contribution to the success of the overthrow.

During the military rule installed by the 1964 coup, the bulk of the party, including most of its leaders, joined the Brazilian Democratic Movement (MDB), the only legal opposition party. A few elements of the PSD's right wing joined the pro-government National Renewal Alliance Party (ARENA).

A second Social Democratic Party was founded in 1987, after the end of the dictatorship. It was based in the rural center-west and led by Ronaldo Caiado, leader of the right-wing landowners' association União Democrática Ruralista. In elections it remained completely unimportant.

References

Literature

External links
Article about the Social Democratic Party on the official website of Fundação Getúlio Vargas 

Conservative parties in Brazil
Defunct political parties in Brazil
Political parties established in 1945
1945 establishments in Brazil
Political parties disestablished in 1965
1965 disestablishments in Brazil
Vargas Era